Hazrat Shahjalal International Airport (Romanized: Hôzrôt Shahjalal Antôrjatik Bimanbôndôr), ( (formerly VGZR)), is the main international airport serving Dhaka City, the capital city of Bangladesh, and it is the largest airport in Bangladesh. It is located in Kurmitola,  from the city centre, in the northern part of Dhaka. The airport is also used as a base of the Bangladesh Air Force. The Civil Aviation Authority of Bangladesh (CAAB) operates and maintains the airport. It started operations in 1980, taking over from Tejgaon Airport as the principal international airport of the country. The airport was formerly known as Dacca International Airport and later as Zia International Airport, before being named in honour of Shah Jalal, who is one of the most respected Sufi saints of Bangladesh. The IATA code of the airport "DAC" is derived from "Dacca", which is the previously used spelling for "Dhaka".

Hazrat Shahjalal International Airport is the primary hub of the national flag carrier, Biman Bangladesh Airlines. In addition, it is also the main hub of most of the private airlines in Bangladesh including Air Astra, Novoair, Regent Airways and US-Bangla Airlines. The annual passenger handling capacity of the airport is 18.5 million passengers, and this passenger handling capacity is predicted by CAAB to be sufficient until 2026. In 2014, the airport handled 9.1 million passengers and 248,000 tonnes of cargo. Average aircraft movement per day is around 190 flights. Ground handling at the airport is provided by Biman Ground Handling, which is a wholly owned subsidiary of Biman Bangladesh Airlines. The airport has complete Wi-Fi Internet coverage and all the terminals of the airport have multiple First Class and Business Class executive lounges operated by Five Star hotels, such as Intercontinental Dhaka; Bangladeshi companies such as Eastern Bank Skylounge or City Bank American Express Lounge; as well as local and foreign airlines. Passengers travelling on First Class or Business Class air tickets, as well as economy passengers who are Priority Pass card holders, have complimentary access to select lounges.

Location and connectivity 
It can be accessed by the eight-lane Airport Road. To the north of the airport lies Uttara area and Gazipur city, while Dhaka city lies to its south. There is a railway station immediately outside (facing) the airport named Airport Railway Station. Lots of Bangladeshi and international ride sharing and ride hailing apps or companies operate vehicles to and from the airport such as Obhai, Pathao, Shohoz, Uber, etc. There is also a taxi kiosk, located near the exit gate of the international arrivals concourse hall, where one can order a taxi and pre-pay the taxi fare. The hotel nearest to the airport is the Radisson Blu Dhaka Water Garden Hotel, closely followed by Le Méridien Dhaka Hotel and the Dhaka Regency Hotel. A Best Western hotel opened in late 2014. The airport has been almost engulfed by the city, due to the expansion and development work of real estate companies and the government, prompting the authorities to construct a third terminal and build another international airport elsewhere in Dhaka district.

History 

In 1941, during the Second World War, the British government built a landing strip at Kurmitola, several kilometres north of Tejgaon, as a spare landing strip for the Tejgaon Airport, which at the time was a military airport, to operate warplanes towards the war fields of Kohima (then in Assam) and Burmese war theatres.

After the creation of Pakistan in 1947, Tejgaon Airport became the first civilian airport in what was then East Pakistan, present day Bangladesh. During the 1965 Indo-Pakistani war, the then abandoned airstrip was bombed by Indian Air Force,  thinking it to be the Tejgaon Airport as the base. In 1966, a project was taken by the then Pakistan Government to construct a new airport, and the present site north of Kurmitola was selected. A tender was floated for the construction of the terminal building and the runway under the technical support of French experts. A rail station (present day Airport Railway Station) was also built near the site for the transportation of construction materials.  However, the new airstrip was only halfway done when the Bangladesh Liberation War broke out in 1971. During war, the airstrip suffered severe damage.

After independence, the Government of Bangladesh restarted works abandoned by the previous contractors and consultants during the war. The government decided to make the airport the country's main international airport and appointed Aéroports de Paris of France as its new consultants. The airport began operations in 1980 after the main runway and central portion of the present terminal building was formally opened by then President of Bangladesh, Ziaur Rahman, as Dacca International Airport ("Dacca" is the former spelling of "Dhaka"). The project took a further three years to complete, during which time Ziaur Rahman was assassinated in 1981. Thus after its completion in 1983, then President Abdus Sattar re-inaugurated the airport as Zia International Airport.

In December 1993, Biman Bangladesh Airlines launched a route to New York City via Delhi, Dubai, and Amsterdam. The flight was operated by McDonnell Douglas DC-10 aircraft, and catered to the many Bangladeshis who lived and studied in the United States. However, the service was not profitable, so Biman discontinued it in July 2006. At the time, outbound flights operated via Dubai and Brussels, while the return leg stopped only in Brussels. In 2010, the government changed the airport's name once again, from Zia International Airport to the present name of Shahjalal International Airport, in honour of Shah Jalal, one of the most respected Sufi saints of Bangladesh.

On 6 December 2011, a Boeing 787-9 (flight ZA006) stopped for refuelling at Shahjalal International Airport during a distance, speed, and endurance record attempt. The Boeing 787 then continued eastbound from Dhaka to return to Boeing Field, setting a world-circling speed record of 42 hours, 27 minutes.

Biman inaugurated a link to Toronto in July 2022 using Boeing 787s. Although the flight from Dhaka to Toronto makes a technical stop in Istanbul, the inbound service is direct.

Development and expansion 

In 1992, the airport terminal area experienced rapid expansion with addition of boarding bridges and equipment. A multistorey car park with space for 500 cars was also built at this time.

The airport has been set up and upgraded with technology and instruments worth  up to the 2nd quarter of 2012, by the CAAB. They include: instrument landing system, distance measuring equipment and flight calibration system, which will help the operational standards of the airport. 2 more boarding bridges have been operational, and another is under manufacturing.
Asphalt runway overlay began in December 2012 by the Bangladeshi company Abdul Monem Ltd; it took 6 months to complete. Further improvements in the taxiway and runway lighting system will be made by funds from Danish International Development Agency (DANIDA) worth . Further projects include: primary and secondary radar, a new control tower and a modern drainage system.
Parking facilities are being upgraded, both for passenger and cargo aircraft, of the airport extension works of passenger and cargo aprons are also going on. The project will cost  and will provide facility to park four wide-bodied passenger aircraft and two wide-bodied cargo aircraft side by side. In recent years CAAB has completed modernisation and beautification of two terminal buildings; constructed five aircraft parking bays; Installed two more boarding bridges; re-installed power plant to ensure 24 hours power supply; added more passenger check-in and immigration counters and baggage conveyor belts.

In the recent years, the internal designs such as concourse, toilets and others parts were also upgraded. The duty-free shops brought in international luxury branded products. As part of the development plan, the first international chain cafe, Barista Lavazza was opened in the international terminal in 2014 followed by Krispy Kreme in 2017.

Second runway
The project was undertaken to cope with the rising air traffic, take pressure off the lone runway and to double the capacity of the airport. CAAB predicts that the airport's traffic will surpass 10 million passengers and freight. However, 60% of the airport's 2000 acre land remained unutilised in 2014.

Development of the third terminal
On 28 December 2019, Prime Minister Sheikh Hasina laid the foundation stone of the third terminal of Hazrat Shahjalal International Airport. The construction work of the third terminal will be done by Aviation Dhaka Consortium (ADC), which comprises Mitsubishi Corporation, Fujita Corporation and Samsung C&T Corporation.

The construction work of the new third terminal of the airport will be completed by 2024. The Japan International Cooperation Agency (JICA) provided financial assistance for a portion of the work in the form of loans. Upon completion of the third terminal, passenger handling capacity of the airport will increase to 20 million from current 8 million per annum. Cargo handling capacity will also increase to 500,000 from 200,000 tonnes annually.

Terminals

Terminal 1, Terminal 2 and Domestic Terminal
The airport mainly consists of three major terminals. Terminal 1 (T1) and Terminal 2 (T2) are for international flights and they are both located within the same building. T1 is located on the ground floor and it is used as the international arrivals concourse hall. T2 is located on the upper floor and it serves as the international departures concourse hall. A third adjacent terminal building, known as the Domestic Terminal, is for domestic flights. This is located to the left of the international terminals. In the one-storey Domestic Terminal, both the arrivals concourse hall and the departures concourse hall are on the same floor.

Terminal 3
A third international terminal is under construction and it is expected to be operational in 2024. According to the project design, the third terminal will have 26 boarding bridges and 12 conveyor belts. The terminal will have 115 check-in counters, 59 immigration desks.

VIP terminal
A VIP terminal building is located to the right of the international terminals.

Cargo terminal
There is a cargo terminal at the airport which has a capacity of 200,000 tons per annum. This will be increased to 500,000 tons after the completion of the ongoing renovation and expansion project.

Airlines and destinations

Passenger

: Biman Bangladesh Airlines's flight from Dhaka to Toronto and vice versa makes a stop at Istanbul for refueling and crew change. Biman Bangladesh does not carry passengers solely from Dhaka to Istanbul. Nor does the airline have fifth freedom rights to fly passengers from Istanbul to Toronto.

Cargo

Accidents and incidents 
 On 28 September 1977, a Japan Airlines Flight 472 en route from Mumbai to Tokyo was hijacked by 5 Japanese Red Army terrorists shortly after takeoff, and forced the plane to land at then Zia International Airport. The terrorists' demand of $6 million and release of 6 JRA terrorists from Japanese prison was met by the Japanese Prime Minister. Bangladesh Air Force was deployed to control the situation in the ground and to facilitate negotiations.
 On 5 August 1984, a Biman Bangladesh Airlines flight from Chittagong crashed in the swamps near Zia International Airport. All 45 passengers and 4 crew of the Fokker F27 died, making it the worst aviation disaster of Bangladesh.

References

External links 

 Civil Aviation Authority, Bangladesh: Airports 

International airports in Bangladesh
Airports established in 1941
Transport in Dhaka
Buildings and structures in Dhaka
Aviation in Bangladesh